George Lamberton (24 December 1880–1954) was an English footballer who played in the Football League for Bury and Clapton Orient.

References

1880 births
1954 deaths
English footballers
Association football forwards
English Football League players
Bury F.C. players
Luton Town F.C. players
Leyton Orient F.C. players
Norwich City F.C. players
Haslingden F.C. players
Colne F.C. players
Hyde United F.C. players
Chorley F.C. players